Tommy Thompson (January 16, 1943September 28, 1978) was an American racing driver of Afro-American descent. Thompson competed in various racing series most notably in the SCCA Formula Super Vee and USAC Mini-Indy series.

Racing career
Thompson first appeared in Formula Super Vee in 1976. The New Yorker competed in the SCCA US Formula Super Vee. Thompson was an engineer and driver for the Black American Racers Association. Thompson ended 25th in the championship scoring three points. In 1976 Thompson participated in the SCCA National Championship Runoffs in the Formula Super Vee class. At Road Atlanta he failed to finish in his Lola T324. Thompson returned to the runoffs in 1977, finishing seventh.

For 1977, Thompson raced again in various Formula Super Vee championships. He won the SCCA NorthEast Division Formula Super Vee championship. In the USAC Mini-Indy Series Thompson competed at Trenton International Speedway failing to finish. He returned to the series in 1978. The Afro-American driver scored his best finish at Mosport Park where he was placed seventh. However, the season came to a dramatic end for Thompson.

Personal life
Thompson's main occupation was a financial systems analyst job.

Death
Thompson participated in the ninth round of the championship at Trenton International Speedway. On the final lap of the 42-lap race one of the other competitor slowed down. John Barringer had to swerve to avoid contact. However Barringer hit Thompson. Barringer's left front wheel and Thompson's right rear wheel became locked. Both cars hit the wall head-on. Thompson's car was launched over the wall. Both Barringer and Thompson were transported to St. Francis Medical Center. Thompson succumbed to his injuries on September 28.

Racing record

SCCA National Championship Runoffs

Complete USAC Mini-Indy Series results

References

1943 births
1978 deaths
Indy Lights drivers
American racing drivers
Racing drivers from New York City
African-American racing drivers
Racing drivers who died while racing
Sports deaths in New Jersey
SCCA Formula Super Vee drivers
SCCA National Championship Runoffs participants
20th-century African-American sportspeople